The Busch Gardens Railway is a  narrow-gauge amusement park railroad attraction located within Busch Gardens Williamsburg amusement park in Williamsburg, Virginia. It features three trains pulled by 4-4-0 steam locomotives manufactured by Crown Metal Products.

Description
Trains run in a clockwise direction, with a complete round trip taking approximately 20 minutes. There are two major bridges on the line, the Rhine River Trestle and the Loch Ness Trestle. The trains are inspected, serviced, and fueled at the Caribou Train Station in New France, which also contains two storage tracks to hold trains not currently in use. Caribou Station also has a water supply that the engine crews use to top off the locomotive's tenders every two laps of operation.

The railway operates three locomotives, each with their own train consisting of open-sided passenger coaches with a livery matching the locomotive.

History
The railway opened in 1975, the same year as the park. It initially operated with two stations at Heatherdowns and New France. The line initially operated with two locomotives, Balmoral Castle and Der Hochbeinige.

In 1987, the park expanded, adding the Festa Italia area, and with it the infill Festa Station, the third (and final) station on the line. In 1997, a third locomotive was acquired from a defunct amusement park, and given an Alpine theme to match the newly-opened Alpengeist roller coaster.

On August 16, 2018, the Balmoral Castle caught on fire. One employee received minor injuries. The locomotive was subsequently repaired and returned to service.

Locomotives
All three locomotives are propane-fueled steam engines.

See also
Crown Metal Products

References

External links

1975 establishments in Virginia
3 ft gauge railways in the United States
Heritage railroads in Virginia
Narrow gauge railroads in Virginia
Passenger rail transportation in Virginia
Railroads of amusement parks in the United States
Railway lines opened in 1975
Transportation in Williamsburg, Virginia